Penicillium megasporum is an anamorph species of the genus of Penicillium which produces megasporizine, phyllostine, asperphenamate and physcion.

References

Further reading 
 
 
 
 
 
 
 

megasporum
Fungi described in 1955